Pamela Kristine Dreyer (born August 9, 1981) is an American ice hockey player. She won a bronze medal at the 2006 Winter Olympics in Turin, where she played 60 minutes and had 10 saves. She graduated from Brown University in 2003.

Awards and honors
2002 ECAC Tournament Most Valuable Player

References

External links
 
 
 
 

1981 births
American women's ice hockey goaltenders
Brown Bears women's ice hockey players
Ice hockey people from Anchorage, Alaska
Ice hockey players at the 2006 Winter Olympics
Living people
Medalists at the 2006 Winter Olympics
Olympic bronze medalists for the United States in ice hockey